Pinhas and Sons (Hebrew: פנחס ובניו) is 9-member, multi-ensemble Israeli fusion band led by Ofer Pinhas, featuring Noa Karadavid on lead vocals. Their music combines elements ranging between progressive rock and Levantine folk music (including songs in Arabic). The group underwent several iterations beginning in 2007, until finally emerging under the Pinhas and Sons name in 2015.

Also in 2018, they released an album called "Baby Pinhas," featuring softened instrumentals of some of their original tacks, intended to be listened to by infants. They have also collaborated with several prominent Israeli musical performers, such as: Shlomo Gronich, Daniel Zamir, Ester Rada, Din Din Aviv, and others.

References
"A day in the life of Ofer Pinhas: to program is a bit like solving a puzzle" (Hebrew), Haaretz, May 13, 2019.
"Pinhas and Sons" (Hebrew), entry on the Habama website.
"Pinhas and Sons return for a second show in Beersheba" (Hebrew), Ynet Beersheba, January 13, 2020.

External links
Official website: https://www.oferpinhas.com

Israeli rock music groups